Where Forever Begins is the second studio album by American country music artist Neal McCoy. It was released in 1992 on the Atlantic label. The album's title track was McCoy's first Top 40 hit on the Billboard country music charts. "Now I Pray for Rain" and "There Ain't Nothin' I Don't Like About You" were also released as singles.

Track listing

Personnel
Mark Casstevens - acoustic guitar, mandolin
Larry Franklin - fiddle
Sonny Garrish - dobro, steel guitar
Steve Gibson - electric guitar
Jana King - background vocals
Chris Leuzinger - electric guitar
Brent Mason - acoustic guitar, electric guitar
Lynn Massey - drums, percussion
Randy McCormick - piano, synthesizer
Neal McCoy - lead vocals, background vocals
Roger McVay - bass guitar
Dee Murray - bass guitar
Lorne O'Neil - bass guitar, background vocals
Donny Parenteau - fiddle, background vocals
Gary Prim - piano, synthesizer
Steve Segler - piano, synthesizer, background vocals
Glenn Shankle - acoustic guitar, background vocals
Milton Sledge - drums
Joe Spivey - fiddle
James Stroud - drums
Glenn Worf - bass guitar
Curtis Young - background vocals

Chart performance

Singles

References

1992 albums
Atlantic Records albums
Neal McCoy albums
Albums produced by James Stroud